Morgan is a city in Calhoun County, Georgia, United States. The population was 1,741 at the 2020 census. The city is the county seat of Calhoun County.

History
Morgan was founded in 1854 as seat of the newly formed Calhoun County. It was incorporated as a city in 1856. The city was named after Hiram Morgan, a county official.

From 1923 to 1929, Morgan was replaced as county seat by Arlington, Georgia after a referendum. It became county seat again after an additional referendum.

Geography

Morgan is located near the center of Calhoun County at  (31.538877, -84.601034).

Demographics

2020 census

Note: the US Census treats Hispanic/Latino as an ethnic category. This table excludes Latinos from the racial categories and assigns them to a separate category. Hispanics/Latinos can be of any race.

2010 Census
As of the census of 2000, there were 1,464 people, 108 households, and 69 families residing in the city. The population density was 1.113 people per square mile (428.2/km2). The racial makeup of the city was 33.13% White, 66.53% African American, and 0.34% from two or more races. Hispanic or Latino of any race were 8.13% of the population.

There were 108 households, out of which 25.0% had children under the age of 18 living with them, 42.6% were married couples living together, 16.7% had a female householder with no husband present, and 35.2% were non-families. 33.3% of all households were made up of individuals, and 18.5% had someone living alone who was 65 years of age or older.  The average household size was 2.23 and the average family size was 2.76.

In the city, the population was spread out, with 3.4% under the age of 18, 17.6% from 18 to 24, 58.4% from 25 to 44, 16.9% from 45 to 64, and 3.7% who were 65 years of age or older.  The median age was 35 years. For every 100 females, there were 992.5 males.  For every 100 females age 18 and over, there were 1,246.7 males.

The median income for a household in the city was $25,000, and the median income for a family was $32,500. Males had a median income of $26,974 versus $16,667 for females. The per capita income for the city was $6,414 (the lowest in the state).  About 19.6% of families and 25.6% of the population were below the poverty line, including 25.0% of those under age 18 and 23.3% of those age 65 or over.

Morgan is the location of a state prison, and the above figures include the prison population.  There are approximately 1,200 males residing at the institution.

Notable people
Billy Bryan, Major League Baseball player
Tom Cheney, Major League Baseball player

References

Cities in Georgia (U.S. state)
Cities in Calhoun County, Georgia
County seats in Georgia (U.S. state)
Former county seats in Georgia (U.S. state)